James John Elementary is a K–5 school within the Portland Public Schools district located in the St. Johns neighborhood of north Portland, Oregon, United States. Built in 1929, it feeds graduates to George Middle School which then feeds Roosevelt High School.

History
James John Elementary is named after the pioneer of St. Johns who bequeathed land and money for the establishment of a school. In 1911, James John High School was built on what is now the playground for the current school. 

The current building was designed by the prolific architect George Howell Jones in a two-story Classical Revival style and influenced by John Dewey’s Progressive Education Movement. It is similar to numerous other "fireproof" Portland schools of the era that were built in response to some highly publicized school fires elsewhere in the U.S.

The school became a K–8 when Roosevelt High School was founded in 1921 and became a K–5 school when George Middle School was founded in 1951. At some point later it again became a K–8 school, and in the fall of 1985, when the new George Middle School was completed James John was again switched to a K–5 elementary school.

Profile
Ethnic/Racial Profile (2017)

Percent Meeting or Exceeding Achievement Benchmarks

Five-year Student Body Growth

Select Demographics 2012-2013

References

External links

 "The History of James John High School" – St. Johns Heritage Association

1929 establishments in Oregon
Buildings and structures in St. Johns, Portland, Oregon
Infrastructure completed in 1911
Portland Public Schools (Oregon)
Public elementary schools in Oregon
Schools in Multnomah County, Oregon